Magdalena González may refer to:

 Magdalena González Furlong (born 1958), Mexican politician
 Magdalena González Sánchez (born 1974), Mexican astrophysicist